Wiawaka is a holiday house for women. It has lake front property on Lake George, New York. It is one of the few remaining fully operational vacation/retreat centers which arose out of the women's rights movement in the early part of the twentieth century. Founded in 1903 by Mary Wiltsie Fuller, Wiawaka provided "affordable vacations" for mainly immigrant female textile workers from Troy and Cohoes, New York, who lacked the economic means to find respite anywhere else.

Today, women of all socio-economic backgrounds and from all over North America are able to enjoy the peaceful atmosphere of Wiawaka since it operates as a nonprofit corporation in order to continue the tradition of "affordable vacations" for all women.

Early history of the property
The earliest reference to the property of Wiawaka is in the tax records of the town of Caldwell (now Lake George) where it is referred to as the old "garrison ground". This suggests that military activity took place on the site which also is home to sunken bateaux, but no archeological survey has been done at Wiawaka to answer these questions.

The first private owner of the lake front property ran the United States Hotel on the site until F. G. Crosby bought the land and building in 1848. Financial difficulties caused him to lease the structure to the Lake George Young Ladies Institute in 1855 but it was shut down after only one year of operation.

Next, he enlarged the hotel, changing the name to Crosbyside, and housed several customers from cities who retreated to Lake George for a vacation in the country. With a new wave of tourism, Mr. Crosby was very successful and he soon built several Victorian cottages as lodging for his best and most loyal customers. These are Mayflower Cottage, c. 1873 and Rose Cottage, c. 1873. He also built a house for himself and his family soon after in 1876 (it was later named Fuller House). The Second Empire style residence is very little altered in its appearance today. In 1890s, Crosbyside was sold to a new owner and declined in the shadow of resorts like the bigger and more luxurious Fort William Henry Hotel.

"The Great Spirit of Woman" over the years 

In 1902, Katrina Trask and her husband Spencer Trask acquired the property. Spencer and Katrina Trask built Wakonda Lodge, formerly called "Amitola", in 1905 as their first experiment in a building an artists' colony before receiving artists at Yaddo. The famous artist Georgia O'Keeffe later stayed in this lodge. Katrina gradually handed over her land to her friend Mary Wiltsie Fuller who had a vision of providing retreats from the polluted city to women factory workers from Troy (known then as The Collar City). Using the original structures built by Mr. Crosby, Mary Fuller opened her retreat center in 1903 and named it Wiawaka Holiday House. Wiawaka is derived from the Abenaki word meaning "The Great Spirit of Woman". Mary proved the existence of the collective "Great Spirit" as she formed a board of women to run and look out for the interests of Wiawaka. Eventually, Wiawaka added workshops covering different skills to add an additional dimension to the guests' vacations.

Today 

Mary Fuller died in the 1940s, but her vision of providing vacations to hard working women continues today, although women of all socio-economic backgrounds are welcome. Wiawaka also takes pride in continuing to offer a diverse range of workshops like those held since its founding. These components combined with its historic foundation lay the cornerstones for its mission statement which follows:

"Wiawaka is a non-sectarian retreat and educational center dedicated to enriching the lives of women, and helping disadvantaged women, including but not limited to women with disabilities, economically disadvantaged women, victims of domestic abuse, the elderly, and other women in transition, to develop skills and personal resources necessary to meet the challenges they face in life. Wiawaka is steward of the preservation, maintenance and operation of its historic property."

In order to give all women the opportunity to go to Wiawaka, room and board is offered on a sliding scale according to income. All three meals are served on site in the same communal dining room that guests have used since 1903. Today, a very diverse range of workshops are offered, all of which have been opened up to the public (the calendar is easily accessible on their website). Some recent workshop topics have included creative writing, poetry readings with Yaddo poet Joan Murray, holistic healing, yoga, quilting, historical lectures, jewelry making, and tours of the historic property. Not only have workshops been opened up to the public, but Wiawaka has also started to offer day use passes as well for those who are not overnight guests yet would like to take advantage of the serene property. Many of Wiawaka's guests return year after year to meet friends, attend workshops, volunteer, live the history, and take in the magical peace tranquility, and spirit that is Wiawaka.

Importance 
Wiawaka is listed on the National Register of Historic Places under nine categories of significance and is listed by the National Park Service as a "Place Where Women Made History". Its place on the National Register is significant as the National Park Service holds high standards regarding the historic value of sites to which it grants this status. Its Victorian cottages, Adirondack lodge, and House of Trix (built directly over the water) are points of historic architectural interest and are listed on the register. A marker on the shore points out the location of the Wiawaka Bateaux which are also on the National Register of Historic Places.

Gallery

References

External links 

 
 National Register of Historic Places
 Places Where Women Made History

Hotel buildings on the National Register of Historic Places in New York (state)
Hotels established in 1903
Houses in Warren County, New York
1903 establishments in New York (state)
Historic districts on the National Register of Historic Places in New York (state)
National Register of Historic Places in Warren County, New York
History of women in New York (state)